The Institute of Pharmacy, Jalpaiguri, is situated in the district of Jalpaiguri in West Bengal, India. It is situated in the District Hospital Campus in Jalpaiguri Town. It used to be known as Jackson's Medical College. It was created by the then British Government as an auxiliary medical institution to grant medical degrees in 1923. It is the first diploma pharmacy college in India, as it has been granting diploma degrees in Pharmacy since 1920.  The school was upgraded to a B.Pharm degree-granting institution in 2003.

History 

The building used to be a medical school named Jackson Medical School (established in 1923). The degree is then granted was abolished by the government of India after introduction of MBBS degree in India. In 1949, the site was renamed the Institute of Pharmacy. Later In 1954 Bidhan Chandra Roy, then the Chief Minister of West Bengal established the pharmacy school with Diploma in Pharmacy Course. In 2003, the four-year Bachelor in Pharmacy (B.Pharma) course was introduced in the Institute. The institute is affiliated to the West Bengal University of Health Sciences (WBUHS) and the State Medical Faculty of West Bengal.

References

External links

Affiliates of West Bengal University of Health Sciences
Pharmacy schools in India
Education in Jalpaiguri
1949 establishments in West Bengal
Educational institutions established in 1949